Edward Hunter (November 22, 1839 – October 12, 1928) was a career American Army officer, who graduated from the West Point on June 23, 1865.  He served in California, Georgia, Idaho, Minnesota, Nevada, New York, Puerto Rico, Virginia, Washington and Washington, D.C.

Early life and family 
He was born in Gardiner, Maine, and died at Mount Vernon, New York. He married Caroline Clay Hoff, (August 1, 1850 – July 1931) on March 27, 1870 in San Francisco, California.  He was the son-in-law of Brevet Colonel Alexander Henry Hoff, Surgeon, US Army and the brother-in-law of Colonel John Van Rennselaer Hoff, Deputy Surgeon General, US Army; January 1902.

Career 

He was commissioned a second lieutenant upon graduation from West Point and was promoted immediately as a first lieutenant in the 12th Infantry Regiment.

He spent his early years as an Indian fighter before transferring to the Judge Advocate General's Corps and Adjutant General's Corps. He took part in the campaigns against the Cheyenne, Arapahoe, Kiowa and Comanche, 1868; the Nez Perce War, 1877; and the Bannock War, 1878; and numerous other nameless skirmishes during that time including the Battle of Soldier Spring.

His first duty was the charge of military prisons in the Department of Virginia upon the surrender of Confederate Forces after the Civil War. These included Libby Prison (this was for Union officers only and because of its high death toll, Libby Prison is generally regarded as second in notoriety only to Andersonville Prison in Georgia) and Castle Thunder Prison (equally known for its brutality and used to hold civilians, political prisoners and spies); and the state penitentiary.

He was then transferred to the Department of New Mexico. He was promoted to captain of the 1st Cavalry Regiment in August 1880.

He transferred to the Department of the Columbia and was stationed at Fort Walla Walla, Washington Territory, (now the city of Walla Walla, Washington), and Fort Colville, (near the now the city of Colville, Washington), in 1877 during and the early 1880s. His daughter Jane Richards Hunter was born at Fort Walla Walla, Washington Territory on July 15, 1882.

He next served for two years in Washington, D.C. as an examiner of claims arising from the Civil War.

He transferred to the Department of California in San Francisco as adjutant of the 12th Infantry. He was then transferred to the 1st Cavalry Regiment and appointed first quartermaster and then adjutant of the regiment. He was adjutant-general of the expedition against the Paiutes. He read for the law and was prompted to major and judge-advocate for the Department of California in December 1888 and was admitted to the California Bar. At the time he was president of the California Sons of the American Revolution.

In 1895, he was promoted to Lieutenant Colonel and deputy judge-advocate and adjutant general in the Department of Dakota at Fort Snelling, St. Paul, Minnesota. When the Spanish–American War broke out he served first at Chickamauga as the mustering officer and then in 1898 he served under General Brooke as judge-advocate in Puerto Rico and as secretary of the committee on evacuation. He was invalided back to the United States because of ill health.

He was promoted to Colonel and judge advocate general  for the Department of the East at Governors Island, New York in May 1901. He retired in 1903 on half pay at the mandatory retirement age of 64.

References

Van Rennselear, Rev. Maunsell; Annals of the Van Resselaers in the United States, Charles Van Benthuysen & Sons; Albany New York 1888

1839 births
1928 deaths
Sons of the American Revolution
United States Military Academy alumni
People from Gardiner, Maine